Lawrence A. Gordon is the EY Alumni Professor of Managerial Accounting and Information Assurance at the University of Maryland’s Robert H. Smith School of Business. He is also an Affiliate Professor in the University of Maryland Institute for Advanced Computer Studies. Gordon earned his Ph.D. in Managerial Economics from Rensselaer Polytechnic Institute. Gordon's research focuses on such issues as economic aspects of information security (including cybersecurity or computer security), corporate performance measures, cost management systems, and capital investments. He is the author of approximately 100 articles.

Bibliography 
 Managerial Accounting: Concepts and Empirical Evidence
 Managing Cybersecurity Resources: A Cost-Benefit Analysis
 Improving Capital Budgeting: A Decision Support System Approach

References

External links
 

Year of birth missing (living people)
Living people
Rensselaer Polytechnic Institute alumni
University of Maryland, Baltimore alumni